Hurlingham  (28 September) is an Argentine city, capital of the Hurlingham Partido in the province of Buenos Aires. It is located in the western part of Greater Buenos Aires.

History
Hurlingham has a long history that spans nearly 140 years. Since its founding, various ethnic groups have contributed to its history including those of British, German, Italian and Spanish descent. The city began with the foundation of the  Hurlingham Club, a sports and social club created by the local Anglo-Argentine community, in 1888.

In December 1994, the municipality was formally created by Provincial Law Number 11,610. The town, located in the central-east region of Buenos Aires Province, is known for its green spaces, (golf research INTA, and the nearby Camino del Buen Ayre.
In addition, the town is also known for being the youngest in Buenos Aires Province.

Location
Hurlingham is located in the Greater Buenos Aires area. It is about 20 km from Argentina's capital city - Buenos Aires. It is bordered by the towns of Villa Tesei, William C. Morris, Buenos Aires and Ituzaingó Partido.

Origin of name
The Hurlingham Club was founded in 1888 by the English community in the area, following the original Hurlingham Club, founded in Fulham (United Kingdom). According to the history of the Hurlingham Club, the name was inherited from Hurlingham House, home of the club's founder, originally built by Dr. William Cadogan in 1760.

Sports
The town has three rugby clubs: Curupaytí, Hurling and El Retiro. All are associated with the Unión de Rugby de Buenos Aires.
The Hurlingham Club is a centre for British sports, including cricket, golf and lawn tennis (having some of the very few grass courts in Latin America). The club is also home to polo and is one of the foremost clubs in Argentina and the world.

Music
The city is the birthplace of some of the main rock bands of the country, such as Sumo, Divididos, Las Pelotas and Gangrena.

Notable people
Derek Mendl (1914–2001), first-class cricketer
Jack Mendl (1911–2001), first-class cricketer
Fausto Vera (born in 2000), footballer
Archibald Williamson (1892-1972), first-class cricketer
Nehéun Pérez (born in 2000), footballer

Notes and references

External links

 Official Website

 
Populated places in Buenos Aires Province
Cities in Argentina
Argentina